Chionodes franclemonti is a moth in the family Gelechiidae. It is found in North America, where it has been recorded from New Jersey and Maine to Florida and Wisconsin.

The larvae feed on Helianthemum nashii and Hudsonia tomentosa.

References

Chionodes
Moths described in 1999
Moths of North America